The Fitzpatricks is an American drama series which ran on CBS during the 1977–78 season. The series premiered on September 5, 1977; it lasted thirteen episodes, and was cancelled on January 10, 1978, failing in the faces of established ABC competitors Happy Days (in its first 30 minutes) and Laverne & Shirley (in its last 30 minutes), which both aired in the show's time-slot of 8:00-9:00 PM Eastern/Pacific on Tuesday nights.

Plot 
The focus was on the Fitzpatricks, an Irish Catholic family of six who lived in Flint, Michigan. The father, blue collar Mike Fitzpatrick, (Bert Kramer) worked overtime as a steelworker to provide a life for the family; while his pregnant wife, Maggie (Mariclare Costello) also worked part-time at a diner as a waitress to help support the family's income. They had four children, eldest son Sean (Clark Brandon); introspective second son, Jack (Jimmy McNichol); only daughter Maureen (nicknamed Mo) (Michele Tobin) and youngest son, Max (Sean Marshall). At various times, all of the Fitzpatrick children had held down part-time jobs to help the often cash-strapped family. They also owned a dog, aptly named Detroit. Also involved in the family was R.J. (Derek Wells), who was Max Fitzpatrick's African-American best friend. A young Helen Hunt played neighbor Kerry Gerardi, supposedly a friend of Mo's, who was interested in the older Fitzpatrick brothers, Sean and Jack, which sparked a bit of a rivalry between the two. Much of the stories deal with moral lessons and also with growing up.

Cast 
 Bert Kramer as Michael Fitzpatrick, a steelworker, and the patriarch of the family.
 Mariclare Costello as Margaret "Maggie" Fitzpatrick, the matriarch, works part-time at a diner to supplement the family income.
 Clark Brandon as Sean Fitzpatrick, the oldest son (16)
 Jimmy McNichol as Jack Fitzpatrick, the second oldest (15) 
  Michele Tobin as Maureen "Mo" Fitzpatrick, the only daughter (14)
  Sean Marshall as Max Fitzpatrick, the youngest at 10, delivers newspapers.  
 Helen Hunt as Kerry Gerardi, the girl next door, who intensified the rivalry between Jack and Sean.  
 Derek Wells as R.J., Max Fitzpatrick's best friend.

Episodes

References

External links 

CBS original programming
1977 American television series debuts
1978 American television series endings
Television series by Warner Bros. Television Studios
1970s American drama television series
English-language television shows
Irish-American mass media
Television series about families
Television shows set in Michigan